Glaucina nephos is a species of geometrid moth in the family Geometridae occurring in North America.

The MONA or Hodges number for Glaucina nephos is 6506.

References

Further reading

 

Boarmiini
Articles created by Qbugbot
Moths described in 1959
Moths of North America